Henry Hugh Clutton (12 July 1850 – 9 November 1909) was an English surgeon who described painless symmetrical hydrarthrosis (an accumulation of water in the cavity of a joint), especially of the knee joints: seen in hereditary syphilis.  The ailment is called "Clutton's joints." He is commemorated by the Clutton Medal and Prize, awarded for excellence in Clinical Surgery at St Thomas's Hospital, King's College School of Medicine and Dentistry.

He was born in Saffron Walden, Essex, the son of Ralph Clutton, and educated at Marlborough College and Clare College, Cambridge.

He was elected the last President of the Clinical Society of London in 1905.

Clutton died at 2 Portland Place, London, and is buried there in Brompton Cemetery.

References

 1938 American Illustrated Medical Dictionary by W. A. Newman Dorland.

External links
 

British surgeons
1850 births
1909 deaths
Burials at Brompton Cemetery
19th-century English people
20th-century British people
Alumni of Clare College, Cambridge
People educated at Marlborough College
People from Saffron Walden